Sayyid Mahmoud Mirlohi is an Iranian reformist politician who is a member of the City Council of Tehran. Mirlohi was formerly a governor and deputy Interior Minister for parliamentary affairs.

He is a member of the 'Reformists' Supreme Council for Policymaking'.

References

Living people
Islamic Iran Solidarity Party politicians
Union of Islamic Iran People Party politicians
Iranian governors
Iranian Vice Ministers
Members of the Reformists' Supreme Council for Policymaking
Islamic Iran Participation Front politicians
Islamic Revolution Committees personnel
Tehran Councillors 2017–
Year of birth missing (living people)
Assembly of Graduates of Islamic Iran politicians